Christine McDougall (born 24 January 1951) is an Australian fencer. She competed in the women's individual foil event at the 1972 Summer Olympics. She was a longstanding member of the Melbourne-based VRI Fencing Club.

References

1951 births
Living people
Australian female foil fencers
Olympic fencers of Australia
Fencers at the 1972 Summer Olympics
Fencers at the 1970 British Commonwealth Games
Commonwealth Games competitors for Australia
20th-century Australian women